Sancha of Castile (21 September 1154/5 – 9 November 1208) was the only surviving child of King Alfonso VII of Castile by his second wife, Richeza of Poland.  On January 18, 1174, she married King Alfonso II of Aragon at Zaragoza; they had at least eight children who survived into adulthood.

A patroness of troubadours such as Giraud de Calanson and Peire Raymond, the queen became involved in a legal dispute with her husband concerning properties which formed part of her dower estates. In 1177 she entered the county of Ribagorza and took forcible possession of various castles and fortresses which had belonged to the crown there.

After her husband died at Perpignan in 1196, Sancha was relegated to the background of political affairs by her son  Peter II. She retired from court, withdrawing to the Hospitaller convent for noble ladies, the Monastery of Santa María de Sigena, at Sigena, which she had founded. There she assumed the cross of the Order of St John of Jerusalem which she wore until the end of her life. The queen mother entertained her widowed daughter Constance at Sigena prior to her leaving Aragon to marry Emperor Frederick II in 1208. She died soon afterwards, aged fifty-four, and was interred in front of the high altar of her foundation at the Monastery of Santa María de Sigena; her tomb is still there to be seen.

Issue

 Peter II (1174/76 – 14 September 1213), King of Aragon and Lord of Montpellier.
 Constance (1179 – 23 June 1222), married firstly King Imre of Hungary and secondly Frederick II, Holy Roman Emperor.
 Alfonso II (1180 – February 1209), Count of Provence, Millau and Razès.
 Eleanor (1182 – February 1226), married Count Raymond VI of Toulouse.
 Ramon Berenguer (ca. 1183/85 – died young).
 Sancha (1186 – aft. 1241), married Count Raymond VII of Toulouse, in March 1211
 Ferdinand (1190 – 1249), cistercian monk, Abbot of Montearagón.
 Dulcia (1192 – ?), a nun at Sijena.

References

Sources

|-

1150s births
1208 deaths
Sancha
Aragonese queen consorts
Leonese infantas
Castilian infantas
12th-century people from the Kingdom of Aragon
12th-century Spanish women
Daughters of emperors
Daughters of kings
Queen mothers